Alytus County is one of ten counties in Lithuania. It is the southernmost county, and its capital is the city of Alytus. Its territory lies within the ethnographic region of Dzūkija. On 1 July 2010, the county administration was abolished, and since that date, Alytus County remains as the territorial and statistical unit.

Municipalities
The municipalities in Alytus County are:

Geography
The town of Druskininkai, a spa visited for its healing waters, is located in Alytus County, as is Grūtas Park, also known as Stalin World, a Soviet theme park. There are more than 420 lakes in Alytus County.

Population by municipality

References

External links
 Social and demographic characteristics of Alytus County
 Economy of Alytus County
 Environment of Alytus County

 
Counties of Lithuania